The Pandya theorem is a good illustration of the richness of information forthcoming from a judicious use of subtle symmetry principles connecting vastly different sectors of nuclear systems. It is a tool for calculations regarding both particles and holes.

Description
Pandya theorem provides a theoretical framework for connecting the energy levels in jj coupling of a nucleon-nucleon and nucleon-hole system. It is also referred to as Pandya Transformation or Pandya Relation in literature. It provides a very useful tool for extending shell model calculations across shells, for systems involving both particles and holes. 

The Pandya transformation, which involves angular momentum re-coupling coefficients (Racah-Coefficient), can be used to deduce one-particle one-hole (ph) matrix elements. By assuming the wave function to be "pure" (no configuration mixing), Pandya transformation could be used to set an upper bound to the contributions of 3-body forces to the energies of nuclear states.

History 
It was first published in 1956 as follows:

Nucleon-Hole Interaction in jj Coupling

S.P. Pandya, Phys. Rev. 103, 956 (1956).
Received 9 May 1956

A theorem connecting the energy levels in jj coupling of a nucleon-nucleon and nucleon-hole system is derived, and applied in particular to Cl38 and K40.

Shell model Monte Carlo approaches to nuclear level densities 
Since it is by no means obvious how to extract "pairing correlations" from the realistic shell-model calculations, Pandya transform is applied in such cases. The "pairing Hamiltonian" is an integral part of the residual shell-model interaction. The shell-model Hamiltonian is usually written in the p-p representation, but it also can be transformed to the p-h representation by means of the Pandya transformation. This means that the high-J interaction between pairs can translate into the low-J interaction in the p-h channel. It is only in the mean-field theory that the division into "particle-hole" and "particle-particle" channels appears naturally.

Features 
Some features of the Pandya transformation are as follows:

It relates diagonal and non-diagonal elements.
To calculate any particle-hole element, the particle-particle elements for all spins belonging to the orbitals involved are needed; the same holds for the reverse transformation. Because the experimental information is nearly always incomplete, one can only transform from the theoretical particle-particle elements to particle-hole.
The Pandya transform does not describe the matrix elements that mix one-particle one-hole and two-particle two-hole states. Therefore, only states of rather pure one-particle one-hole structure can be treated.

Pandya theorem establishes a relation between particle-particle and particle-hole spectra. Here one considers the energy levels of two nucleons with one in orbit j and another in orbit j''' and relate them to the energy levels of a nucleon hole in orbit j and a nucleus in j. Assuming pure j-j'' coupling and two-body interaction, Pandya (1956) derived the following relation:

This was successfully tested in the spectra of

Figure 3 shows the results where the discrepancy between the calculated and observed spectra is less than 25 keV.

Bibliography

Notes

References 
  (formula 3.68)
 
 
 
 
 

Nuclear physics
Physics theorems